Godwin-Austen may refer to:

People
Alfred Reade Godwin-Austen (1889-1963), British Army general
Robert Alfred Cloyne Godwin-Austen (1808-1884), geologist
Henry Haversham Godwin-Austen (1834-1923), topographer, geologist and malacologist, namesake of K2, son of Robert

Places
Godwin Austen Glacier near K2 in Gilgit-Baltistan, Pakistan
Mount Godwin-Austen, also known as K2